Shuangtaizi District is an urban district under the administration of the prefectural city of Panjin in Liaoning province, People's Republic of China. The district's name came from the Shuangtaizi River, the old name (until 2011) of the modern-day lower Liao River, which flows through the southern edge of the district.

The district's postal code is 124000, and the district government is located at 32 Shengli Street.

Administrative divisions
Shuangtaizi District administers nine subdistricts: 
Dongfeng Subdistrict, Shengli Subdistrict, Liaohe Subdistrict, Hongqi Subdistrict, Jianshe Subdistrict, Shiyou Subdistrict, Huagong Subdistrict, Shuangsheng Subdistrict, Tiedong Subdistrict

References

External links

County-level divisions of Liaoning
Panjin